This is a list of yearly Ivy League football champions.

Champions by year

Championships by team

References

Ivy League
Champions